Omar Luis Martínez (born July 15, 1972 in Camagüey, Cuba) is a Cuban baseball player and Olympic gold medalist.

Martínez is a one time Gold medalist for baseball, winning at the 1996 Summer Olympics.

External links
Olympic Info

1972 births
Living people
Sportspeople from Camagüey
Olympic baseball players of Cuba
Baseball players at the 1996 Summer Olympics
Olympic gold medalists for Cuba
Olympic medalists in baseball

Medalists at the 1996 Summer Olympics
Central American and Caribbean Games gold medalists for Cuba
Competitors at the 1998 Central American and Caribbean Games
Central American and Caribbean Games medalists in baseball